Dorothy Chang (born 1970) is an American-born composer and a professor of music at the University of British Columbia.

Early life and education
Chang was born in Winfield, Illinois. Her parents' families had fled to Taiwan from China during the Chinese Civil War, before immigrating to the United States. She graduated from the University of Michigan and Indiana University Jacobs School of Music in 2000 with degrees in composition. She married Canadian flutist Paolo Bortolussi, and the pair moved to British Columbia.

Career
In 2003, Chang joined the music faculty at the University of British Columbia.

Chang composed a number of works for solo flute, including "Mirage II" and "Wrath".

In 2007, Chang was the composer-in-residence of the Albany Symphony Orchestra.
Her work "Strange Air" was performed at the Cabrillo Festival of Contemporary Music in 2008.

Chang was one of several Canadian composers commissioned by the Calgary Philharmonic Orchestra in 2017  to create the orchestra and dance piece True North: Symphonic Ballet, to celebrate Canada's 150th birthday. Chang composed the fourth movement, "Northern Star". The complete work was performed at Calgary's True North Festival, and "Northern Star" was later performed by the Toronto Symphony Orchestra and at the Orpheum in Vancouver.

Chang wrote the first concerto for the combination of piano, erhu, and orchestra ever written, Gateways, in 2017-18. The work was commissioned for PEP (Piano and Erhu Project) by the Henan-Canada Friendship Association, Philharmonia Northwest, and PEP (Piano and Erhu Project). The world premiere of the chamber orchestra version of Gateways was given by PEP (Piano and Eru Project) and members of the Vancouver Symphony Orchestra in Vancouver in April 2018; the world premiere of the full orchestral version of Gateways was given by PEP (Piano and Eru Project) and Philharmonia Northwest in Seattle in March 2019.

Selected compositions
Streams
Northern Star
Strange Air
Flight (concerto for flute and orchestra)
Gateways (2017–18) - the first concerto for piano, erhu, and orchestra ever written

References

External links 
 

1970 births
Living people
American women composers
American music educators
American women music educators
American expatriates in Canada
American expatriate academics
Academic staff of the University of British Columbia
University of Michigan School of Music, Theatre & Dance alumni
People from Winfield, Illinois
Jacobs School of Music alumni
American musicians of Chinese descent
American academics of Chinese descent
American women academics